Christus Apollo: Cantata Celebrating the Eighth Day of Creation and the Promise of the Ninth is a cantata in four movements for narrator, mezzo-soprano, choir, and orchestra, based on a text by the science fiction author Ray Bradbury and composed by the American composer Jerry Goldsmith.  The piece was commissioned by the California Chamber Symphony in 1969, and premiered later that year in Royce Hall at UCLA with the narration performed by Charlton Heston (who had starred in the 1968 film, Planet of the Apes, for which Goldsmith had composed the musical score).

Style and composition
Christus Apollo consists of four movements separated by narration; a complete performance lasts approximately 35 minutes.  The musical landscape of the piece blends elements of dodecaphonism and impressionism.  In the 2002 Telarc release, Goldsmith commented on the work's inception and composition:

Reception
Richard S. Ginell of the Los Angeles Times praised the work, saying, "It's a mystical, ear-enticing souvenir from the year of the first moon landing, with long stretches of narration and no maudlin compromises."  Gramophone also lauded the cantata, saying, "It’s an ambitious‚ sincere and supremely wellwrought offering‚ whose progressive harmonic sensibility and imaginative instrumental resource will come as no surprise to anyone familiar with Goldsmith’s genuinely adventurous and striking score from the previous year for Franklin J. Schaffner’s science fiction classic‚ Planet of the Apes."

Discography
A 33.3 RPM vinyl recording was made for the participants of the original 1969 performance. Only 10 known copies exist. A CD version of this recording was released by Tsunami Records, Germany, in 1995.

A recording of Christus Apollo was released February 26, 2002 through Telarc and features Goldsmith's other orchestral works Music for Orchestra and Fireworks: A Celebration of Los Angeles.  The recording was conducted by Goldsmith and performed by the mezzo-soprano Eirian James, the London Voices, the London Symphony Orchestra, and narrator Anthony Hopkins.

References

External links
Text of the composition

Compositions by Jerry Goldsmith
1969 compositions
Cantatas
20th-century classical music
Compositions for symphony orchestra
Twelve-tone compositions
Compositions with a narrator
Works by Ray Bradbury